Ngau Chi Wan was a bay beneath Hammer Hill in New Kowloon, Hong Kong. It now refers to an area where Choi Hung Estate is situated.

Features
Amidst in an urban built-up area, the original Ngau Chi Wan Village remains. St. Joseph's Home for the Aged is famous in the area and now under redevelopment. The cluster of Ngau Chi Wan Civic Centre, Ngau Chi Wan Municipal Services Building and Ngau Chi Wan Sports Centre serve the needs of neighbouring housing estates.

Sam Shan Kwok Wong Temple is located in Ngau Chi Wan, along Kwun Tong Road. “Sam Shan” refers to three famous mountains of Chaozhou in Guangdong , namely Du Shan , Ming Shan and Jin Shan. The Hakkas also worship the Lords of the Three Mountains and would build a temple in their new migrated place. The temple has been renovated for several times. At the end of the lunar year, there will also be a small flower fair at the open area outside the temple. 

Ngau Chi Wan Park opened in 2011.

Transport
The area is close to MTR Choi Hung station. There are also bus and minibus links, via routes to Sai Kung District and HKUST.

Education
Good Hope Primary School and Kindergarten (Primary Section) is in the area. Factwire described it as "renowned" in 2021.

References

External links

 Sam Shan Kwok Wong Temple in Ngau Chi Wan

 
Bays of Hong Kong
New Kowloon
Populated places in Hong Kong
Wong Tai Sin District